Pemberton is a borough in Burlington County, in the U.S. state of New Jersey. As of the 2020 United States census, the borough's population was 1,371, a decrease of 38 (−2.7%) from the 2010 census count of 1,409, which in turn reflected an increase of 199 (+16.4%) from the 1,210 counted in the 2000 Census.

Pemberton was incorporated as a borough by an act of the New Jersey Legislature on December 15, 1826, within portions of New Hanover Township and Northampton Township (now known as Mount Holly Township). Pemberton became an independent borough . The borough is named for James Pemberton, a property owner in the area.

It is a dry community, where alcohol is not permitted to be sold legally, as affirmed by the most recent referendum which was held in 1980.

Geography
According to the United States Census Bureau, the borough had a total area of 0.61 square miles (1.57 km2), including 0.59 square miles (1.53 km2) of land and 0.02 square miles (0.04 km2) of water (2.79%).

Pemberton is an independent municipality within the boundaries of and completely surrounded by Pemberton Township, making it one of 21 pairs of "doughnut towns" in the state, where one municipality entirely surrounds another.

Demographics

2010 census

The Census Bureau's 2006–2010 American Community Survey showed that (in 2010 inflation-adjusted dollars) median household income was $65,568 (with a margin of error of +/− $9,899) and the median family income was $74,773 (+/− $17,679). Males had a median income of $44,750 (+/− $5,830) versus $46,406 (+/− $8,202) for females. The per capita income for the borough was $36,399 (+/− $6,078). About 2.8% of families and 6.0% of the population were below the poverty line, including 12.5% of those under age 18 and 1.8% of those age 65 or over.

2000 census
As of the 2000 United States census there were 1,210 people, 470 households, and 316 families residing in the borough. The racial makeup of the borough was 78.43% White, 12.73% African American, 0.66% Native American, 2.40% Asian, 2.73% from other races, and 3.06% from two or more races. Hispanic or Latino of any race were 8.60% of the population.

There were 470 households, out of which 35.7% had children under the age of 18 living with them, 44.7% were married couples living together, 15.1% had a female householder with no husband present, and 32.6% were non-families. 26.4% of all households were made up of individuals, and 6.0% had someone living alone who was 65 years of age or older. The average household size was 2.56 and the average family size was 3.06.

In the borough the population was spread out, with 26.8% under the age of 18, 9.5% from 18 to 24, 34.7% from 25 to 44, 20.1% from 45 to 64, and 8.9% who were 65 years of age or older. The median age was 34 years. For every 100 females, there were 103.0 males. For every 100 females age 18 and over, there were 95.6 males.

The median income for a household in the borough was $44,063, and the median income for a family was $48,500. Males had a median income of $34,911 versus $25,474 for females. The per capita income for the borough was $18,909. About 7.2% of families and 7.8% of the population were below the poverty line, including 9.4% of those under age 18 and 1.0% of those age 65 or over.

Government

Local government
Pemberton Borough is governed under the Borough form of New Jersey municipal government, which is used in 218 municipalities (of the 564) statewide, making it the most common form of government in New Jersey. The governing body is comprised of a Mayor and a Borough Council, with all positions elected at-large on a partisan basis as part of the November general election. A Mayor is elected directly by the voters to a four-year term of office. The Borough Council is comprised of six members elected to serve three-year terms on a staggered basis, with two seats coming up for election each year in a three-year cycle. The Borough form of government used by Pemberton is a "weak mayor / strong council" government in which council members act as the legislative body with the mayor presiding at meetings and voting only in the event of a tie. The mayor can veto ordinances subject to an override by a two-thirds majority vote of the council. The mayor makes committee and liaison assignments for council members, and most appointments are made by the mayor with the advice and consent of the council.

, the Mayor of Pemberton Borough is Republican Harold Griffin, whose term of office ends December 31, 2023. Members of the Borough Council are Council President Bonnie Haines (R, 2022), Robert Brock (R, 2022), Karl "Nick" Conner (R, 2024), Terry Jerome (R, 2023), Andrea Martin (R, 2024) and Melissa Tettemer (R, 2023; elected to serve an unexpired term)

In September 2020, Melissa Tettemer was chosen to fill the seat expiring in December 2023 that became vacant following the death of George Ward. Tettemer was elected in November 2020 to serve the rmaainedr of the term of office.

The borough council appointed Harold Griffin in January 2014 to fill the vacant seat of William Kochersperger, who had resigned from his seat as mayor that month.

Federal, state and county representation
Pemberton Borough is located in the 3rd Congressional District and is part of New Jersey's 8th state legislative district.

 

Burlington County is governed by a Board of County Commissioners comprised of five members who are chosen at-large in partisan elections to serve three-year terms of office on a staggered basis, with either one or two seats coming up for election each year; at an annual reorganization meeting, the board selects a director and deputy director from among its members to serve a one-year term. , Burlington County's Commissioners are
Director Felicia Hopson (D, Willingboro Township, term as commissioner ends December 31, 2024; term as director ends 2023),
Deputy Director Tom Pullion (D, Edgewater Park, term as commissioner and as deputy director ends 2023),
Allison Eckel (D, Medford, 2025),
Daniel J. O'Connell (D, Delran Township, 2024) and 
Balvir Singh (D, Burlington Township, 2023). 
Burlington County's Constitutional Officers are
County Clerk Joanne Schwartz (R, Southampton Township, 2023)
Sheriff James H. Kostoplis (D, Bordentown, 2025) and 
Surrogate Brian J. Carlin (D, Burlington Township, 2026).

Politics
As of March 2011, there were a total of 883 registered voters in Pemberton, of which 250 (28.3% vs. 33.3% countywide) were registered as Democrats, 266 (30.1% vs. 23.9%) were registered as Republicans and 367 (41.6% vs. 42.8%) were registered as Unaffiliated. There were no voters registered to other parties. Among the borough's 2010 Census population, 62.7% (vs. 61.7% in Burlington County) were registered to vote, including 77.4% of those ages 18 and over (vs. 80.3% countywide).

In the 2012 presidential election, Democrat Barack Obama received 346 votes (52.9% vs. 58.1% countywide), ahead of Republican Mitt Romney with 294 votes (45.0% vs. 40.2%) and other candidates with 4 votes (0.6% vs. 1.0%), among the 654 ballots cast by the borough's 901 registered voters, for a turnout of 72.6% (vs. 74.5% in Burlington County). In the 2008 presidential election, Democrat Barack Obama received 383 votes (55.4% vs. 58.4% countywide), ahead of Republican John McCain with 295 votes (42.7% vs. 39.9%) and other candidates with 9 votes (1.3% vs. 1.0%), among the 691 ballots cast by the borough's 882 registered voters, for a turnout of 78.3% (vs. 80.0% in Burlington County). In the 2004 presidential election, Republican George W. Bush received 259 votes (56.9% vs. 46.0% countywide), ahead of Democrat John Kerry with 193 votes (42.4% vs. 52.9%) and other candidates with 3 votes (0.7% vs. 0.8%), among the 455 ballots cast by the borough's 591 registered voters, for a turnout of 77.0% (vs. 78.8% in the whole county).

In the 2013 gubernatorial election, Republican Chris Christie received 320 votes (69.1% vs. 61.4% countywide), ahead of Democrat Barbara Buono with 129 votes (27.9% vs. 35.8%) and other candidates with 5 votes (1.1% vs. 1.2%), among the 463 ballots cast by the borough's 902 registered voters, yielding a 51.3% turnout (vs. 44.5% in the county). In the 2009 gubernatorial election, Republican Chris Christie received 229 votes (48.4% vs. 47.7% countywide), ahead of Democrat Jon Corzine with 185 votes (39.1% vs. 44.5%), Independent Chris Daggett with 38 votes (8.0% vs. 4.8%) and other candidates with 5 votes (1.1% vs. 1.2%), among the 473 ballots cast by the borough's 897 registered voters, yielding a 52.7% turnout (vs. 44.9% in the county).

Historic district

The Pemberton Historic District is a  historic district encompassing the borough. It was added to the National Register of Historic Places on March 22, 1989, for its significance in historic archaeology, architecture, industry, religion and exploration/settlement. The district has 180 contributing buildings, including the individually listed Morris Mansion and Mill.

The First Baptist Church was organized in 1752. The current church on Hanover Street was built in 1861 with Greek Revival style. The Methodist Church was founded in 1774, the third in the state. The current church was built in 1895.

Education
The Pemberton Borough School District is no longer operational. Starting with the 2007–08 school year, all public school students from Pemberton Borough attend the schools of the Pemberton Township School District, with Pemberton Borough a part of the combined school district. The district is one of 31 former Abbott districts statewide that were established pursuant to the decision by the New Jersey Supreme Court in Abbott v. Burke which are now referred to as "SDA Districts" based on the requirement for the state to cover all costs for school building and renovation projects in these districts under the supervision of the New Jersey Schools Development Authority. The school district serves Pemberton Borough and Pemberton Township (including the communities of Browns Mills, Country Lake Estates, Pemberton Heights and Presidential Lakes Estates and the Pemberton Township portion of Fort Dix). As of the 2021–22 school year, the district, comprised of nine schools, had an enrollment of 4,443 students. Schools in the district (with 2021–22 enrollment data from the National Center for Education Statistics) are 
Pemberton Early Childhood Education Center (with 416 students; PreK), 
Samuel T. Busansky Elementary School (281; 3–5), 
Denbo-Crichton Elementary School (850; K–5), 
Howard L. Emmons Elementary School (293; K-2), 
Fort Dix Elementary School (317; PreK-5), 
Joseph S. Stackhouse Elementary School (223; K-2), 
Marcus Newcomb Middle School (307; 6), 
Helen A. Fort Middle School (661; 7–8) and 
Pemberton Township High School (1,029; 9–12).

Students from Pemberton, and from all of Burlington County, are eligible to attend the Burlington County Institute of Technology, a countywide public school district that serves the vocational and technical education needs of students at the high school and post-secondary level at its campuses in Medford and Westampton.

Transportation

Roads and highways

No Interstate, U.S. or state highways directly serve Pemberton. The most significant roadway passing through the borough is County Route 530.

Public transportation
NJ Transit provides bus service in the township on the 317 route between Asbury Park and Philadelphia. BurLink bus service is offered on the B1 route between Beverly and Pemberton).

Notable people

People who were born in, residents of, or otherwise closely associated with Pemberton include:

 Jeff Celentano (born 1960), actor, screenwriter and director
 George Franklin Fort (1808–1872), 16th Governor of New Jersey
 John Franklin Fort (1852–1920), 33rd Governor of New Jersey, from 1908–1911
 Bushrod W. Lott (1826–1886), politician in the Minnesota Territory who served as United States Consul in Tehuantepec, Mexico, from 1862 to 1865, appointed by President Abraham Lincoln
 Rex Marshall (1919–1983), actor, television announcer and radio personality
 Isaac Witkin (1936–2006), sculptor

References

External links

 Borough of Pemberton

 
1826 establishments in New Jersey
Borough form of New Jersey government
Boroughs in Burlington County, New Jersey
Populated places established in 1826